Sugar Run Creek is a tributary of the Susquehanna River in Bradford County, Pennsylvania, in the United States.

Course
Sugar Run Creek begins near a pond in North Branch Township. It flows north and immediately enters Windham Township. In this township, the creek continues north for a short distance before turning west. A short distance downstream, the creek enters Wilmot Township. It then turns northwest and flows past Grant Hill. Continuing northwest, the creek flows parallel to Pennsylvania Route 187 and receives the tributaries Rock Cabin Run and Panther Lick Creek. It then turns north and slightly east and picks up the tributary Sugar Run. The valley of the creek broadens and a couple of miles later, the creek reaches its confluence with the Susquehanna River.

Hydrology
The discharge of Sugar Run Creek ranges from 2.4 cubic feet per second to 31 cubic feet per second. The turbidity of the creek's waters is 21 JTU.

The concentration of dissolved oxygen in the waters of Sugar Run Creek is 10.0 milligrams per liter and the concentration of carbon dioxide ranges from 1.2 to 1.8 milligrams per liter. The pH of the creek's waters ranges between 7.0 and 7.7.  The concentration of bicarbonate in the creek ranges between 7.0 and 53 milligrams per liter and the concentration of carbonate is 0.0 milligrams per liter.

Geography

Biology
Trout reproduce naturally in Sugar Run Creek.

See also
List of rivers of Pennsylvania

References

Rivers of Pennsylvania
Tributaries of the Susquehanna River
Rivers of Bradford County, Pennsylvania